Chuman (also Romanized as Chūmān) is a village in Bowalhasan Rural District, Namshir District, Baneh County, Kurdistan Province, Iran. At the 2006 census, its population was 251, in 57 families. The village is populated by Kurds.

References 

Towns and villages in Baneh County
Kurdish settlements in Kurdistan Province